Zsolt Bubán (born 10 February 1962) is a Hungarian equestrian. He competed in two events at the 1992 Summer Olympics.

References

External links
 

1962 births
Living people
Hungarian male equestrians
Olympic equestrians of Hungary
Equestrians at the 1992 Summer Olympics
People from Nyíregyháza
Sportspeople from Szabolcs-Szatmár-Bereg County
20th-century Hungarian people